
This is a list of aircraft in numerical order of manufacturer followed by alphabetical order beginning with 'M'.

Mr

Mráz 
 Mráz K-65 Čáp
 Mráz M.1 Sokol
 Mráz M-2 Skaut
 Mráz M-4

References

Further reading

External links 

 List Of Aircraft (M)

fr:Liste des aéronefs (I-M)